"Ven, devórame otra vez is the lead single from Lalo Rodríguez's album, Un nuevo despertar. The song with lyrics by Dominican songwriter Palmer Hernández is noted for its sexual content at the time of the salsa romantica era. The song reached number ten on the Billboard Hot Latin Tracks chart. At the first Premio Lo Nuestro awards in 1989, the song was awarded "Tropical Song of the Year". It was listed on Billboards  "15 Best Salsa Songs Ever" in 2018.

Chart performance

Azúcar Moreno version 

In 1990, Spanish female-duo, Azúcar Moreno covered the song from their album, Bandido. This version peaked at No. 9 on the Hot Latin Tracks chart.

Chart performance

Charlie Cruz version

In 2004, Charlie Cruz covered "Ven, devórame otra vez" on his album, Como nunca. This version peaked at No. 10 on the Latin Tropical Airplay chart.

References

1988 songs
1988 singles
1990 singles
2005 singles
Lalo Rodríguez songs
Azúcar Moreno songs
Charlie Cruz songs
Rodven Records singles
CBS Records singles
Epic Records singles
Sony Music singles
Spanish-language songs